Carlen may refer to 
Carlen (surname)
Carlen House, a historic house museum in Alabama, United States
Carlen v Drury (1812), a UK partnership law case